Öckerö IF is a Swedish football club located in Öckerö.

Background
Öckerö IF currently plays in Division 4 Göteborg B which is the sixth tier of Swedish football. They play their home matches at the Prästängen in Öckerö.

The club is affiliated to Göteborgs Fotbollförbund. Öckerö IF have competed in the Svenska Cupen on 12 occasions and have played 22 matches in the competition.

Season to season

In their most successful period Öckerö IF competed in the following divisions:

In recent seasons Öckerö IF have competed in the following divisions:

Footnotes

External links
 Öckerö IF – Official website
 Öckerö IF on Facebook

Football clubs in Gothenburg
Öckerö Municipality
Football clubs in Västra Götaland County